Simona Păduraru (born 21 November 1981 in Bacău) is an international freestyle swimmer from Romania, who represented her native country at two consecutive Summer Olympics, starting in 2000 in Sydney, Australia. Prior to that tournament, at the 2000 European Aquatics Championships in Helsinki, Finland, she was a member of the women's relay team that won the gold medal in the 4×200 m freestyle and the bronze medal in the 4×100 m freestyle. After retiring and giving birth to her first child, Maria-Catinca, in 2007, Simona continued taking part in swimming events. In 2018, she was awarded the title of Honorable Citizen of the city Bacău by the city mayor at that time.

External links
 Profile on Romanian Olympic Committee
 

1981 births
Living people
Olympic swimmers of Romania
Sportspeople from Bacău
Romanian female freestyle swimmers
Swimmers at the 2000 Summer Olympics
Swimmers at the 2004 Summer Olympics
European Aquatics Championships medalists in swimming